Burch is an English surname that most likely originated in Hyndley Birch, Rusholme, Manchester, England. The origins of the name can be traced back as far as 1500. The name can also be a variation of Birch, being derived from one who resides at or near a birch-tree.

Notable people with the surname include:

 Allen Banks Burch (1894–1948), Justice of the Kansas Supreme Court
 Ashly Burch (born 1990), American actor
 Benjamin Franklin Burch (1825–1893), American politician and soldier in Oregon
 Billy Burch (1900–1950), American professional ice hockey 
Charles Benson Burch (born 1948) Justice of the California Superior Court
Charles C. Burch (1928–1979), American politician from Tennessee
 Claire Burch (1925–2009), American author, filmmaker and poet
 Desiree Burch, London-based American comedian
 Edward Burch (born 1968), musician and journalist in Austin, Texas
 Elizabeth Chamblee Burch, American lawyer and the Charles Hughes Kirbo Chair Professor at University of Georgia
 George E. Burch (1910–1986), American cardiologist
 J. Christopher Burch (born 1953), American venture capitalist and entrepreneur
 Jeff Burch, Canadian politician
 Jeannine Burch (born 1968), Swiss actress
 Jennings Michael Burch (1941–2013), American writer
 John Burch (1932–2006), British pianist
 John B. Burch (born 1929), American zoologist
 John Chilton Burch (1826–1885), California politician
 John Christopher Burch (1827–1881), Secretary of the US Senate
 John E. Burch (1896–1969), American producer and director
 Joy Burch, Australian politician
 Laurel Burch (1945–2007), American artist, designer and businesswoman
 Lucius E. Burch Jr. (1912–1996), American lawyer
 Marc Burch (born 1984), American soccer player for D.C. United
 Matt Burch, computer programmer
 Michael R. Burch (born 1958), American poet
 Newton D. Burch (1871–1931), Justice of the South Dakota Supreme Court
 Noël Burch (born 1932), American film theorist
 Rob Burch (politician) (born 1942), American politician
 Ron Burch, American writer and TV producer
 Rousseau Angelus Burch (1862–1944), Justice of the Kansas Supreme Court
 Samuel Burch (1889–1974), politician in Manitoba, Canada
 The Burch Sisters, American country music trio
 Timmy Burch, character on the animated TV series South Park
 Tory Burch (born 1966), American fashion designer
 William P. Burch (1846–1926), American thoroughbred trainer
 Matthew Burch (1985-present), American lawyer

See also
Burch (disambiguation)
Birch (disambiguation)
Birch (surname)

Surnames of English origin